Eupithecia liguriata is a moth in the family Geometridae. It is found in Italy, France and on the Iberian Peninsula, as well as in North Africa.

The larvae feed on Sedum dasyphyllum.

Subspecies
Eupithecia liguriata liguriata
Eupithecia liguriata ketama Herbulot, 1981

References

External links
Lepiforum.de

Moths described in 1884
liguriata
Moths of Europe
Moths of Africa
Taxa named by Pierre Millière